Găiceana is a commune in Bacău County, Western Moldavia, Romania. It is composed of four villages: Arini, Găiceana, Huțu and Popești.

References

Communes in Bacău County
Localities in Western Moldavia